"How It Is" is a song by American rapper Roddy Ricch and British rappers Yxng Bane and Chip featuring The Plug. The song was released on February 28, 2019.

Music video
A music video to accompany the release of "Young & Free" was first released onto YouTube on February 28, 2019.

Charts

Certifications

References

2019 singles
2019 songs
Roddy Ricch songs
Songs written by Roddy Ricch
Songs written by Chip (rapper)